The Polish Academy Award for Best Costume Design is an annual award given to the best Polish costume design of the year.

Winners and nominees

References

External links
 Polish Film Awards; Official website 

Polish film awards
Awards established in 2001